Grevillea candolleana, commonly known as the Toodyay grevillea, is a species of flowering plant in the family Proteaceae and is endemic to a restricted part of the south-west of Western Australia. It is a shrub with narrow egg-shaped to linear leaves and white to cream-coloured flowers.

Description
The lower surface of the leaves is covered with soft, felty hairs.

Taxonomy
Grevillea candolleana was first formally described in 1845 by Carl Meissner in Johann Georg Christian Lehmann's Plantae Preissianae from specimens collected by James Drummond in the Swan River Colony. The specific epithet (candolleana) honours Augustin Pyramus de Candolle.

Distribution and habitat
This grevillea grows in woodland in a small area around Toodyay in the Avon Wheatbelt, Jarrah Forest and Swan Coastal Plain biogeographic regions of south-western Western Australia.

Conservation status
Grevillea candicans is listed as "Priority Two" by the Western Australian Government Department of Biodiversity, Conservation and Attractions, meaning that it is poorly known and from only one or a few locations.

References

candolleana
Proteales of Australia
Eudicots of Western Australia
Plants described in 1845
Taxa named by Carl Meissner